Terror Twilight is the fifth and - as of 2023 - final studio album by American indie rock band Pavement, released on June 8, 1999, on Matador Records in the US and Domino Recording Company in the UK.

Terror Twilight was produced by Nigel Godrich, who hoped to create a "straighter" album and bring Pavement to a wider audience. He and the band disagreed over some creative choices, and songwriter Stephen Malkmus later expressed dissatisfaction with the album. It received positive reviews. After finishing the tour for the album, Pavement disbanded. In 2022, Matador released an expanded reissue, Terror Twilight: Farewell Horizontal.

Recording 
Terror Twilight was produced by British producer Nigel Godrich, who had gained fame for his work with Radiohead, Beck and REM. Godrich, a Pavement fan, accepted the job without having met the band or seen them perform. Hoping to help them find a bigger audience, he wanted to make an album that "stood up straighter" and would "reach people who were turned off by the beautiful sloppiness of other Pavement records". According to songwriter Stephen Malkmus, Godrich asked no fee, asking only for royalties. However, Malkmus said: "We paid for the studio time, of course, which started to get expensive. Because [Godrich] had his own, uh, standards."

The group began work in Sonic Youth's studio in lower Manhattan, New York. Godrich found the studio limiting, so the group moved to RPM Studios near Washington Square Park, once used by Beastie Boys, where Malkmus estimated three quarters of the album were recorded. Dominic Mercott of High Llamas played drums for two tracks when Steve West could not play in time; Malkmus also played drums on one track. Overdubbing and editing took place in London at RAK Studios and Godrich's studio Shebang. Radiohead guitarist Jonny Greenwood added harmonica on "Platform Blues" and "Billie". Godrich mixed the album at Mayfair Studios.

According to percussionist Bob Nastanovich, Godrich struggled with the band's casual approach, and called for more takes than they were used to. Though Nastanovich said Godrich took on a "substantial challenge" and "did a good job", he felt he only connected with Malkmus and disregarded the other band members; Nastanovich realized after several days that Godrich did not know his name. The band was also less familiar with the new material, as it was driven entirely by Malkmus. Guitarist Scott Kannberg was unhappy that Malkmus was not interested in working on songs Kannberg had written, and said it was the hardest Pavement record to make.

Deciding the track list created conflict. Godrich wanted to begin the record with "Platform Blues" and end with "Spit on a Stranger"; he felt it should open with a "longer, more challenging song to set the tempo", similar to the 1997 Radiohead album OK Computer. However, the band wanted to open with an "easier" song. Malkmus recalled, "Nigel was like, 'I'm done with this. This is the wrong move. We made a stoner album and you're going halfway.' He’s right probably."

Content
Many of the tracks on Terror Twilight were previewed at a pair of solo Malkmus shows in California on August 12–13, 1998. These included "Ann Don't Cry", "Carrot Rope", "Spit On A Stranger", "Platform Blues", "You Are The Light", "Folk Jam", and two others that remain unreleased ("Civilized Satanist," which used a Moby Grape sample, and "Dot Days").

At these shows, Malkmus played electric guitar and sang along with home demo recordings of the songs.  The style of the recordings was similar to those found on the compilation At Home With the Groovebox ("Robyn Turns 26" and "Watch Out!"), the B-sides of the "Spit on a Stranger" single ("Rooftop Gambler" and "The Porpoise And The Hand Grenade"), and the demo version of "Major Leagues" found on the Major Leagues EP.

"The Hexx" was a quieter, slowed-down version of a discordant jam that was played extensively on the Brighten The Corners tour. Pavement had recorded a faster, louder version during the Brighten The Corners sessions—in fact, at one point "The Hexx" was to have been the opening track on that album. This recording was edited, retitled "...And Then" and issued as the vinyl B-side to "Spit on a Stranger". The original, full-length recording can be found on Brighten The Corners: Nicene Creedence Edition. The single edit also appears among eight bonus tracks on the vinyl incarnation of the Creedence edition.

The original cover art for Terror Twilight lists the final track, "Carrot Rope," as "...And Carrot Rope."  This alternate song title was revived for the 2010 Record Store Day version of Quarantine the Past, even though the song was the fifth track on side one.

Initial UK copies of the album came with a bonus CD-ROM which contained the whole album with a brief track-by-track commentary; film of Stephen Malkmus writing this – and calling for the help of his fellow band members in doing so – can be seen on the Slow Century DVD. The disc also contained the videos for "Stereo" and "Shady Lane" from their previous album Brighten the Corners and a home movie segment containing some footage also seen in the Slow Century DVD.

Nastanovich came up with the title, and described its meaning in an interview: "Terror Twilight is the short span between sunset and dusk; this is considered the most dangerous time in traffic, because half of the people switch on the headlights, and the other half doesn't. It's when most accidents happen." His original suggestion was Farewell Horizontal, but he dismissed this as "there was no way I was going to be on the Farewell Horizontal tour for the next year".

Legacy 
Terror Twilight was Pavement's final album before their breakup. Godrich said he could "sense it was the end" during the recording, and that "people had differences of opinion". Fans perceived the lines "The damage is done / I am not having fun any more" from "Ann Don't Cry" as a veiled reference to the band's end.

Pavement embarked on a six-month world tour for Terror Twilight, during which time relationships within the group frayed, especially between Malkmus and the other members. After their show at the 1999 Coachella Festival, Malkmus told his bandmates he did not want to continue. During the final concert of the tour, at Brixton Academy in London on November 20, 1999, Malkmus had a pair of handcuffs attached to his microphone stand and told the audience: "These symbolize what it's like being in a band all these years." About two weeks later, a spokesperson for their record label told NME that Pavement had "retired for the foreseeable future".

In 2017, Malkmus described Terror Twilight as "a real classic-rock overproduced $100,000 record. With that much money you should be able to make something good. We made some things that weren't as good as they could've been." In response to the comments, Godrich tweeted: "I literally slept on a friend's floor in NYC to be able to make that album." In 2020, Godrich said that he loved the album and had enjoyed making it. He said: "Maybe there were some internal politics, as there are in any band, but I made a friend forever in Stephen ... The writing may have been on the wall even before I got there, but I don't think I had any part of that."

On April 8, 2022, Pavement released a special edition reissue, Terror Twilight: Farewell Horizontal, including 28 previously unreleased tracks. The vinyl set uses the track listing that Godrich suggested.

Track listing

Personnel
 Stephen Malkmus – vocals, guitar
 Bob Nastanovich – percussion, keyboards
 Scott Kannberg – vocals, guitar
 Steve West – drums, percussion
 Mark Ibold – bass, vocals
 Dominic Murcott – drums on "Major Leagues" and "Carrot Rope"
 Jonny Greenwood – Harmonica on "Platform Blues" and "Billie"
 Produced and mixed by Nigel Godrich

Charts

Bibliography
Jovanovic, Rob (2004). Perfect Sound Forever: The Story of Pavement. (Boston) Justin, Charles & Co. .

References

1999 albums
Pavement (band) albums
Matador Records albums
Domino Recording Company albums
Flying Nun Records albums
Albums produced by Nigel Godrich